This is a list of notable awards won by Reading Rainbow.

Action for Children's Television

Daytime Emmy

Image Awards

Monitor Awards

Primetime Emmy Awards

Television Critics Association Awards

Lists of awards by television series
Accolades